The Netherlands–Venezuela Boundary Treaty is a 1978 treaty between territory of the Netherlands and Venezuela which delimits the maritime boundary between territory of the Kingdom of the Netherlands and Venezuelan territory. When the treaty was concluded in 1978, the treaty set out the boundary between what was known as the Netherlands Antilles and Venezuela. Today, it establishes the boundary between Aruba and Venezuela, between Curaçao and Venezuela, and between the BES islands and Venezuela.

The treaty was signed on 31 March 1978. The text of the treaty establishes a complex border that is set out in four individual maritime sectors. Sector A creates the boundary between the ocean west of Aruba and Venezuelan territory. Sector B creates the boundary between the Venezuelan mainland and the Leeward Islands of the Netherlands Antilles (including Aruba, Bonaire, and Curaçao). Sector C creates the boundary between Bonaire and Venezuelan territory. Finally, further north, Sector D creates the boundary between Isla Aves (Venezuela) and Saba and Sint Eustatius (Netherlands Antilles). The far eastern point of Sector C and the far western point of Sector D are connected by the west–east United States – Venezuela boundary, which was agreed to in the United States – Venezuela Maritime Boundary Treaty, signed just days before the Netherlands–Venezuela treaty.

In places, the boundary lines were adjusted from the natural equidistant lines because of considerations of the placement of oilfields and other mineral deposits in the area.

The full name of the treaty is Boundary Delimitation Treaty between the Republic of Venezuela and the Kingdom of the Netherlands.

Notes

References
 Anderson, Ewan W. (2003). International Boundaries: A Geopolitical Atlas. Routledge: New York. ;  OCLC 54061586
 Jagota, S. P. (1985). Maritime Boundary. Martinis Nijhoff: Dordrecht. ; ;  OCLC 	1175640

See also 
 Borders of Venezuela
 United States–Venezuela Maritime Boundary Treaty

External links
Full text of treaty
Full text

1978 in the Caribbean
1978 in the Netherlands
Treaties concluded in 1978
Aruba–Venezuela border
Curaçao–Venezuela border
Boundary treaties
Treaties of Venezuela
Treaties of the Netherlands
Netherlands–Venezuela relations
United Nations treaties
Treaties extended to Aruba
Treaties extended to the Netherlands Antilles